Christopher Gary Dawson (born 2 September 1994) is a footballer who plays as a midfielder for Ossett United where he is on dual-registration from Buxton. He has represented Wales at under-21 level.

He is a graduate of Leeds United's academy and has also played for Rotherham United and Norwegian side Viking FK. 2022 saw him re join the Crabs Pocket FC where he enjoyed great success.

Club career

Leeds United
After progressing through Leeds United's youth ranks, Dawson signed a professional deal at Leeds United in October 2012, keeping him at the club until the summer of 2015. Dawson was named as an unused substitute in three first team matches, during this period manager Neil Warnock compared Dawson's style of play and ability to that of former Leeds United legend John Giles. Dawson was given his debut for the Leeds first team by Neil Warnock on 1 April 2013, starting the 2–1 loss against Derby County, but he was substituted in the 55th minute for Ross McCormack. Shoulder surgery ended Dawson's season prematurely, however, Dawson signed a new three-year contract with the club on 8 May 2013.

After playing with Leeds' first team during the 2014–15 pre-season, Dawson scored a hat trick for Leeds in the 5–0 pre-season friendly victory against Glenavon on 30 July 2014. On 1 August, Dawson was assigned the Leeds number 24 shirt for the 2014–15 season. On 1 November 2014, Dawson made his first appearance for the first team since his debut, when he came on as a substitute in Neil Redfearn's first game as permanent head coach in a 3–1 loss to Cardiff City.

Dawson was not included in United's 25-man travelling squad for the 2015-16 pre-season. On 31 July 2015, Dawson was not assigned a Squad Number for the upcoming 2015/16 season. Dawson was released from his Leeds United contract on 26 January 2016.

Rotherham United
On 28 January 2016, Dawson signed a contract with Rotherham United until the end of the 2016–17 season. He made no first team appearances during the 2015–16 season, having appeared on the bench once. On 17 August 2016 Dawson went on loan from Rotherham to Norwegian club Viking FK until the end of 2016. Dawson made his debut on 21 August in Viking's 2–1 away defeat to Tromsø IL in Tippeligaen, coming on as a 65th-minute substitute for Samuel Adegbenro. Dawson was released by the club at the end of his contract, having not played a game for the club.

Scarborough Athletic
After a spell out injured recovering from an Anterior cruciate ligament injury, on 20 March 2018, Dawson signed for Northern Premier League side Scarborough Athletic on a 12-game contract. Where he helped the club earn promotion to Northern Premier League by finishing 2nd in the NPL Division One North and also reach the North Riding Senior Cup final.

Bradford (Park Avenue)
On 25 July 2018, Dawson joined National League North side Bradford (Park Avenue) on a permanent deal, after impressing initially on trial. On 10 February 2019, Dawson was loaned out to Grantham Town for one month. On 14 March, the deal was extended for the rest of the season.

Return to Scarborough Athletic
On 10 July 2019 Scarborough Athletic announced that Dawson had returned to the club.

Buxton
Despite having agreed a deal to remain at Scarborough for the 2020–21 season, he signed for Northern Premier League Premier Division side Buxton in July 2020, though his debut season at the club was disrupted and eventually cancelled due to COVID-19. In summer 2021, he extended his contract for the 2021–22 season.

On 30 December 2022, Dawson returned to the Northern Premier League when he joined Ossett United on a dual-registration basis.

International career
In January 2013 he was selected in the Wales under-21 squad and made his debut in the 3–0 win against Iceland Under-21 in a friendly match on 6 February 2013.

In March 2013, Dawson received plaudits from Wales under-21 Manager Geraint Williams for both his passing ability and capacity to influence a game, the latter being in spite of his relatively small stature.

Career statistics

Club

References

External links

1994 births
Living people
Association football midfielders
Bradford (Park Avenue) A.F.C. players
Buxton F.C. players
Eliteserien players
English expatriate footballers
English expatriate sportspeople in Norway
English Football League players
English footballers
English people of Welsh descent
Expatriate footballers in Norway
Footballers from Dewsbury
Grantham Town F.C. players
Leeds United F.C. players
Northern Premier League players
Ossett United F.C. players
Rotherham United F.C. players
Scarborough Athletic F.C. players
Viking FK players
Wales under-21 international footballers
Welsh expatriate footballers
Welsh footballers